The 2009 Sultan Qaboos Cup was the 37th edition of the Sultan Qaboos Cup, the premier knockout tournament for football teams in Oman.

The competition began on 25 September 2009 with the Round of 32 and concluded on 7 December 2009. Al-Suwaiq Club were the defending champions, having won their first title in 2008. On Monday 7 December 2009, Saham SC were crowned the champions of the 2009 Sultan Qaboos Cup when they defeated Dhofar S.C.S.C. 7–6 on penalties after the match had ended 2-2 after extra time, hence winning the title for the first time.

Teams
This year the tournament had 32 teams. The winners qualified for the 2010 AFC Cup.
 Ahli Sidab Club (Sidab)
 Al-Bashaer Club 
 Al-Ittihad Club (Salalah)
 Al-Kamel Wa Al-Wafi SC 
 Al-Khaboora SC (Al-Khaboora)
 Al-Musannah SC (Al-Musannah)
 Al-Mudhaibi SC (Mudhaibi)
 Al-Nahda Club (Al-Buraimi)
 Al-Nasr S.C.S.C. (Salalah)
 Al-Oruba SC (Sur)
 Al-Salam SC (Sohar)
 Al-Seeb Club (Seeb)
 Al-Shabab Club (Seeb)
 Al-Suwaiq Club (Suwaiq
 Al-Tali'aa SC (Sur)
 Al-Wahda SC (Sur)
 Bahla Club (Bahla)
 Bowsher Club (Bawshar)
 Dhofar S.C.S.C. (Salalah)
 Fanja SC (Fanja)
 Ibri Club (Ibri)
 Ja'lan SC (Jalan Bani Bu Ali)
 Majees SC (Majees)
 Mirbat SC (Mirbat)
 Muscat Club (Muscat)
 Nizwa Club (Nizwa)
 Oman Club (Muscat)
 Quriyat Club (Quriyat)
 Saham SC (Saham)
 Salalah SC (Salalah)
 Sohar SC (Sohar)
 Sur SC (Sur)

Round of 32
32 teams played a knockout tie. 16 ties were played over one leg. The first match played was between Dhofar S.C.S.C. and Sur SC on 25 September 2009. 16 teams advanced to the Round of 16.

Round of 16
16 teams played a knockout tie. 8 ties were played over one leg. The first match was played between Al-Nasr S.C.S.C. and Muscat Club on 1 October 2009. 8 teams advanced to the Quarterfinals.

Quarterfinals
8 teams played a knockout tie. 4 ties were played over two legs. The first match was played between Al-Oruba SC and Al-Suwaiq Club on 18 October 2009. Al-Suwaiq Club, Saham SC, Dhofar S.C.S.C. and Oman Club qualified for the Semifinals.

1st Legs

2nd Legs

Semifinals
4 teams played a knockout tie. 2 ties were played over two legs. The first match was played between Dhofar S.C.S.C. and Oman Club on 8 November 2009. Saham SC and Dhofar S.C.S.C. qualified for the Finals.

1st Legs

2nd Legs

Finals

References

External links
Oman Sultan Cup 2009-2010 at Goalzz.com

Sultan Qaboos Cup seasons
Cup